Brigadier Joseph Semwanga, is a Ugandan military officer. He currently serves as the Commander of the Armoured Brigade, based in Masaka. He was appointed to his current position in May 2013, replacing Major General David Muhoozi, who became the Commander of Land Forces within the Uganda People's Defence Forces.

Background and training
Joseph Semwanga was born in 1973 in Mukono District. He joined the army in 1995 and was commissioned on July 4, 1997 after completing the Officer Cadet Course at Monduli Military Academy, Tanzania. He has attended a number of military courses, including the following:

 An Instructors' Course
 A Course in Special Forces Light Infantry
 A Tank Crew Course
 A Tank Platoon Command Course
 A Tank Technology Course in India
 A Tank Company Command Course
 A Tank Battalion Command Course
 A Senior Command and Staff College Course, in Tanzania, in 2008.

Military career
Joseph Semwanga has held a number of appointments in the UPDF, including the following:
 Administrative Officer, Kalama Armoured Warfare Training School, Kabamba, Mubende District
 Chief Instructor Kalama Armoured Warfare Training School, Kabamba, Mubende District
 Commandant Kalama Armoured Warfare Training School, Kabamba, Mubende District
 Brigade Operations and Training Officer, Armoured Brigade, Masaka, Masaka District
 Commandant Armoured Brigade, Masaka, Masaka District - His current post.

See also
 Katumba Wamala
 David Muhoozi
 Uganda People's Defence Force

References

External links
Joseph Semwanga Promoted To Colonel In January 2013

People from Mukono District
Living people
Ganda people
Ugandan military personnel
Tanzania Military Academy alumni
1973 births